Özge Borak (born 14 February 1982) is a Turkish actress. She is best known for the comedy film Eyyvah Eyvah. She worked as actor for numerous different roles in theatrical Güldür Güldür Show which were released on ShowTv. In April 2012 she married the comedian Ata Demirer. The couple later got divorced in November 2014.

Filmography

References

External links
 

1982 births
Living people
Turkish film actresses
Turkish television actresses
Actresses from Istanbul